Bradford "Brad" J. Barrett is an American politician and physician serving as a member of the Indiana House of Representatives from the 56th district. He assumed office on November 7, 2018.

Education 
Barrett earned a Bachelor of Science degree in professional studies from the University of Notre Dame and a Doctor of Medicine from the Ohio State University College of Medicine.

Career 
From 1988 to 1993, Barrett worked as an intern and resident at Indiana University Health University Hospital. He was the president and owner of General Surgeons from 1993 to 2017 and also worked as chief of surgery for Reid Hospital. He was elected to the Indiana House of Representatives in November 2018. Barrett has also served as vice chair and chair of the House Public Health Committee.

References 

Living people
American surgeons
American physicians
Physicians from Indiana
Republican Party members of the Indiana House of Representatives
University of Notre Dame alumni
Ohio State University College of Medicine alumni
Year of birth missing (living people)